Altay is a county-level city in Altay Prefecture within Ili Kazakh Autonomous Prefecture, in far Northern Xinjiang, China. The city centre is located on the slopes of Kelan River.

Administrative divisions
Subdistricts
Jinshan (Altin Taw) Road Subdistrict (جىنشەن يولى كوچا باشقارمىسى, التىن تاۋ جولى كوشە ءىس باسقارماسى)
Jiefang (Azad) Road Subdistrict (ئازاد يولى كوچا باشقارمىسى, ازات جولى كوشە ءىس باسقارماسى)
Tuanjie (Intimaq/Ittipaq) Road Subdistrict (ئىتتىپاق يولى كوچا باشقارمىسى, ىنتىماق جولى كوشە ءىس باسقارماسى)
Qiaxiu Road Subdistrict (شاشۋ جولى كوشە ءىس باسقارماسى)
	
Town
 Aweitan (ئاۋىيتان بازىرى, ءابيتان قالاشىعى)
 Hongdun (خۇڭدۆڭ بازىرى, حۇڭدۇن قالاشىعى)

Township
Qimuerqieke Township (شەمىرشەك يېزىسى, شەمىرشەك اۋىلى)
Alaqaq (Alahake) Township (ئالاقاق يېزىسى, الاقاق اۋىلى)
Lasti Township (لاستى يېزىسى, لاستى اۋىلى)
Kalaxilike Township ( / قاراشىلىك يېزىسى)
Sa'erhusong Township (سارخۇلسۇن يېزىسى, سارعۋسىن اۋىلى)
Balbaghay Township (بالباغاي يېزىسى, بالباعاي اۋىلى)
Qie'erkeqi (Shirikshi) Township (شىرىكشىي يېزىسى, شىرىكشى اۋىلى)

Ethnic Township
 Xandighati Mongol Ethnic Township (خاندىغاتى موڭغۇل يېزىسى‎, حاندىعاتى موڭعۇل اۋىلى)

Others
Kalagashi Ranch
Aketumusike Ranch
XPCC No. 181 (181-تۇەن مەيدانى)
XPCC No. 189

Climate
Altay has a cold semi-arid climate (Köppen BSk), with an annual precipitation total of only . Spring and autumn are short but mild. With monthly percent possible sunshine ranging from 50% in December to 74% in August and September, sunshine is abundant and the city receives 2,993 hours of bright sunshine annually.

Demographics

Transport
China National Highway 216
China National Highway 217
Altay Xuedu Airport
Train until Beitun city which is about one hour by car from Altay City.

From Ürümqi (capital of Xinjiang Province) to Altay, it takes about one hour by plane, 9 hours by day bus, 12 hours by night bus and about 14 hours by train (towards Beitun City).

Culture
Like other cities in Xinjiang Uyghur Autonomous Region, there are many minorities in Altay, in particular Uyghurs and Kazakhs.

The Dundbulag rock carvings in the Xandighati Mongol Ethnic Township (A.K.A. Handagaitu, Handgait; tyv. Handagaity; uyg. Handigati; cmn. Handegate) under this city is an earliest evidence of ski. The term Mongol here partially refers to ethnic Tuvans of Mongol nation under Chinese designation.

Education
In schools, students are taught mainly in Chinese (Mandarin) and there are courses for Uyghur and Kazakh languages.

Tourism
The most important tourist site is Kanas Lake where there is a legend of a large creature.

Economy

People
 Ma Fuxiang (1876–1932), military governor of Altay
 Rebiya Kadeer (born 1947), secessionist and political activist
 Kanat Islam (born 1984), boxer
 Dinigeer Yilamujiang (born 2001), skier

References

External links

Populated places in Xinjiang
Altay Prefecture
County-level divisions of Xinjiang